Luminar may refer to:

Luminar Leisure, a British company that operates bars and nightclubs, now Deltic Group
Luminar (software), photo editing software
Luminar Technologies, an American developer of vision technology for self driving cars